Scougal, also Scougall, is a Scottish surname and may refer to:

Scougal
Henry Scougal (1650–1678), Scottish theologian
John Scougal (1645–1730), Scottish painter
Patrick Scougal (1607–1682), Scottish churchman

Scougall
David Scougall (c.1610 – c.1680), Scottish portrait painter
Stefan Scougall (born 1982), Scottish footballer

See also 
 Scoughall

References

Surnames of Scottish origin